Circle of Friends may refer to:

 Circle of Friends (disabled care), a method in social care
 Circle of Friends (novel), a 1990 novel by Maeve Binchy
 Circle of Friends (1995 film), a film based on Binchy's novel
 "Circle of Friends", a song on the Better Than Ezra album Surprise
 "Circle of Friends", a song on the Point of Grace album Life Love & Other Mysteries
 Circle of Friends (Dexter), an episode of the television series Dexter
 Circle of Friends (Bob Mould video), a 2005 DVD by Bob Mould
 The Circle of Friends, a cult operating in Morristown, New Jersey and Washington DC from the 1970s.